Callosamia angulifera, the tuliptree silkmoth or giant silkmoth, is a moth of the family Saturniidae. It is found in North America from Massachusetts east through central New York, southern Ontario, and southern Michigan to central Illinois, south to the Florida panhandle and Mississippi.

The wingspan is 80–110 mm. There is one generation per year with adults on wing from June to August in the north and two generations with adults on wing from March to April and again in August in the south.

The larvae feed on Liriodendron tulipifera. Adults do not feed.

External links

Silkmoths

Saturniinae
Moths of North America
Moths described in 1855